GaloTV, formerly TV Galo, is a free subscription-based, Internet channel and online media entirely dedicated to the Brazilian football team Atlético Mineiro. The channel offers Atlético's fans exclusive interviews with players and staff, in addition to coverage of training sessions and matches, footballing news, and other themed programming.

A project of the club's Multimedia Centre and Press Section, the channel was originally broadcast on cable television company NET, also with an online service through Atlético Mineiro's official website and YouTube. On 30 August 2015, Atlético announced some of the channel's content would also be broadcast in pay-per-view channel Premiere FC, before the club's live matches and during the week.

Staff
Emmerson Maurilio (Coordinator)
Thiago Carodso
Marco Aurélio Froes
Guilherme D'Assumpção

References

External links
Official website
TV Galo on YouTube

Clube Atlético Mineiro
Television channels and stations established in 2007
2007 establishments in Brazil
Portuguese-language television stations in Brazil
Mass media in Belo Horizonte